Philibert Bouttats (fl. 17th century) was a Flemish engraver. His prints consist chiefly of portraits, and are rather neatly engraved.

Biography 
Bouttats was born about the year 1650, in Antwerp, the son of Frederik Bouttats the Younger.

He died at the age of 72.

Works

Portraits

Pope Innocent XI
The Dauphin, Son of Louis XIV; oval
Mary Antonia Victoria, of Bavaria, Dauphiness
Elizabeth Charlotte, Duchess of Orleans
William Henry, Prince of Orange
Christian V, King of Denmark
Herman Werner, Bishop of Paderborn
John Sobieski, King of Poland
Thesis, with the Portrait of the Bishop of Miinster

Other works
Convent 'Bethlehem' in Herent near Leuven (1699)

References

External link

Year of birth unknown
Year of death unknown
Artists from Antwerp
17th-century engravers
18th-century engravers
Flemish engravers